Elmon is a given name. Notable people with the name include:

 Elmon T. Gray (1925–2011), American lumberman, real estate developer, philanthropist, and politician
 Elmon Scott (1853–1921), associate justice and chief justice of the Washington Supreme Court
 Elmon Wright (1929—1984), American jazz trumpeter

See also
 Elman (name)